Jalpaiguri is a city in the Indian state of West Bengal.

Jalpaiguri may also refer to:

 Jalpaiguri district
 Jalpaiguri division
 New Jalpaiguri railway station
 Jalpaiguri Junction railway station
 Jalpaiguri Town railway station
 Jalpaiguri Road railway station
 Jalpaiguri (Vidhan Sabha constituency)
 Jalpaiguri (Lok Sabha constituency)
 Jalpaiguri (community development block)
 Jalpaiguri Zilla School
 Holy Child School, Jalpaiguri